Bahadur (Hindi: बहादुर), is a character type of Hindi literature and media. Similar to commedia dell'arte's Zanni, Bahadur is a servant.

Origin of the name
Bahadur is a common middle name in Chettri Nepalese community whence the character Bahadur hails. Further, "Bahadur" literally means brave, and is possibly a nod to nominative determinism.

Characteristics
Bahadur is a brave, loyal, occasionally naïve watchman or guard. He is a dispossessed immigrant worker of Nepalese origin.

References

Nepalese given names
Stock characters